Claude-Curdin Paschoud (born April 3, 1994) is a Swiss professional ice hockey defenceman who currently plays for HC Davos in the Swiss National League (NL).

Career statistics

Regular season and playoffs

International

References

External links

1994 births
Living people
People from Davos
HC Davos players
Swiss ice hockey defencemen
Sportspeople from Graubünden